is a private university in Kure, Hiroshima, Japan. The school first opened as a junior women's college in 1986 and became a four-year college in 1995.

References

External links
 Official website

Educational institutions established in 1986
Private universities and colleges in Japan
Universities and colleges in Hiroshima Prefecture
1986 establishments in Japan